Kelemen may refer to:

People
Attila Kelemen (1948–2022), ethnic Hungarian politician in Romania and Member of the European Parliament
Barnabás Kelemen (born 1978), Hungarian violinist
Dávid Kelemen (born 1992), Hungarian football player
Endre Kelemen (born 1947), retired Hungarian high jumper
Éva Kelemen (born 1987), Hungarian handballer
Fred Kelemen (born 1964), film director and cinematographer
Hunor Kelemen (born 1967), Romanian politician and Hungarian language writer
Katalin Kelemen, the first female rabbi in Hungary, where she was born
Kelemen Mikes (1690–1761), Transylvanian-born Hungarian political figure and essayist
László Kelemen LLM, (born 1958), Hungarian attorney-at-law and writer
Marián Kelemen (born 1979), Slovak footballer goalkeeper, currently playing for Slask Wroclaw
Milko Kelemen (1924–2018), Croatian composer
Miloš Kelemen (born 1999), Slovak ice hockey player
Zoltán Kelemen (baritone) (1926–1979), Hungarian bass-baritone
Zoltán Kelemen (figure skater) (born 1986), Romanian figure skater
R. Daniel Kelemen, professor of political science and law at Rutgers University

Places
Kelemen, Croatia, village in Croatia
Kelemen-havasok or Călimani Mountains, the largest volcanic complex of the Carpathian Mountains in Transylvania, Romania
Kelemen-patak or Călimănel River, tributary of the Mureş River in Transylvania, Romania

See also 
Clemens (disambiguation)
Keleman
Klemen
Klemens
Kliment (disambiguation)
Klimt

Hungarian masculine given names
Hungarian-language surnames